= Joseph Summers (hymnwriter) =

Joseph Summers (1843–1916) was a musician and composer.

He wrote tunes for Christian hymns, including "Palmyra", which is often associated with the hymn Thou art the everlasting word.
